The 1933 Griffith Park Fire was a brush fire that occurred October 3, 1933 in Griffith Park in Los Angeles, resulting in the deaths of at least 29 civilians who were trying to fight the fire.

Background
During the dry summer and fall of 1933, thousands of workers financed by the Reconstruction Finance Corporation were hired to clear dry brush and to build trails and roads in Griffith Park. On October 3, 1933, an estimated 3,780 men were working in the park, for a pay of 40 cents an hour. More than 100 squads of 50 to 80 men were at work in the park, each supervised by a foreman or "straw boss".

Fire
A little after 2 p.m. local time, a small fire started in a pile of debris in Mineral Wells Canyon. Many of the workers volunteered or were ordered to fight the fire, but it spread up the canyon. Because there was no piped water in the area, the men tried to beat out the fire with shovels. Foremen with no knowledge of firefighting initially directed the effort, setting inappropriate back fires and sending hundreds of workers into a steep canyon. The fire department arrived at 2:26 p.m. but found it hard to fight the fire because of the presence of thousands of untrained people. When the wind changed direction at about 3 p.m., the fire rushed up Dam Canyon, jumped a hastily constructed firebreak, and advanced on the workers, killing dozens and injuring more than 100.

Aftermath
Because of the disorganized nature of the deployment and the often inaccurate recordkeeping of the work project, it took weeks to establish the exact death toll and identify the bodies. A month after the fire, the District Attorney's office put the official death toll at 29, with 27 dead at the scene and two dead in hospitals afterwards. The Griffith Park fire remained the single-deadliest wildfire in California history for 85 years until being surpassed by the Camp Fire in 2018, which killed at least 83 people. 

To commemorate the fallen workers, a deodar tree was planted at the entrance to the park along with a memorial plaque. The plaque can no longer be found. The courts ruled that victims were not eligible for civil compensation  due to their unofficial employment by a 'straw boss' (Ca. Public Resources Code)

See also

 List of California wildfires

References

1933 in California
1933 natural disasters in the United States
1933 wildfires
Griffith Park
History of Los Angeles
Santa Monica Mountains
Wildfires in Los Angeles County, California
October 1933 events
1933 fires in the United States
1930s wildfires in the United States